Everglades High School is a public school located in Miramar, Florida, United States. The school serves approximately 2,425 students from Miramar and Pembroke Pines in grades 9 through 12. The current school hours are from 7:40 a.m. to 2:40 p.m. The most recent principal was Haleh Darbar, who was promoted effective February 1, 2022.

In the 2007–08 school year due to overpopulation, another high school was constructed in Pembroke Pines, Florida, West Broward High School to resolve the overcrowding issue.

Everglades High currently has an FCAT school grade of an "A" for the 2017–18 Academic School Year. Everglades has a student to teacher ratio of 22:1, above the state average of 15:1.

History 

Everglades High School was created to provide students in the Southern District of West Broward a secondary education school. At the time only Miramar High School, Charles W. Flanagan High School, and Cypress Bay High School composed the Southwest Region of secondary High Schools in the Broward Country School District.

The temporary location was at the former Charles W. Flanagan High School's Annex location because of the ongoing final construction of the Everglades main building. The school schedule was held in double sessions during the months at the annex because of the large population, where the class of 2007 freshman had classes from 12:30 p.m. to 5:30 p.m. and upperclassmen had classes from 7:00 a.m. to 12:00 p.m. The class of 2004 of Everglades had a total of 12 senior students.

For the 2007–08 school year, freshmen students were sent to the annex portable site that they had originally used for the school's first class of students. The following 2008–2009 school year, Everglades High School was given new school boundaries due to the newly constructed West Broward High School in the Pembroke Pines area. Since then, all students including freshman take their classes at Everglades High School and the former Charles W. Flanagan Annex is no longer in use for lower-class men.

In 2010, Former Florida Governor Charlie Crist visited the High School to honor the recognition of the school's success in improving test scores and graduation rates.

In 2012 the Former Principal of Everglades High School, Paul D Fletcher, retired from his position. He had served the school since its opening.

In June 2018, Everglades High School hosted the National Speech and Debate competition along with other schools across the Fort Lauderdale region.

In February 16 2023, there was a bomb threat in the school, students were evacuated to the nearby Glades Middle School before given an all clear by the Miramar Police.

Demographics
As of the 2021-22 school year, the total student enrollment was 2,020. The ethnic makeup of the school was 42.6% White, 42% Black, 37.6% Hispanic, 10.6% Asian, 0.1% Pacific Islander, 3.9% Multiracial, and 0.7% Native American or Native Alaskan.

Academics 
Everglades High School offers programs in the field of Engineering, Sports Medicine, and Early Human Development. Students are able to take these courses with in these programs and apply them to the Bright Futures Scholarship Program.  
 
Everglades High School's Engineering program is MasterCam Certified and students are eligible to receive a certification through the CNC program.

Everglades High School began its Sports Medicine program beginning the 2014–15 school year.

In addition to these career-oriented school programs, Everglades High School has implemented a Cambridge International Program, awarding Advanced International Certificate of Education, affiliated with the University of Cambridge. It is described by the school as an "accelerated program" that offers a "flexible, broad-based curriculum."

In recent time, the school has seen alumni move on to top-ranking colleges and universities. Notably, the class of 2017 graduated students who matriculated into Ivy League institutions (Harvard, Yale, and Cornell), Pomona College, University of Miami, University of Florida, and the US Air Force Academy.

Athletics 
The 2006 girls' Varsity Softball team became state champions in 2007.

JROTC 

The JROTC program at Everglades has maintained an Honor Unit with Distinction (HUD) status since 2007 and has sent cadets to several competitive national conventions including the George C. Marshal Leadership Symposium, and the JROTC Academic Bowl.

The Gator Battalion participated in the Broward County Drill Meet, The Superintendents Pass and Review. The Battalion received its highest marks on their annual inspection by the County SAI.
In the 2014-15 School year, The Gator Battalion Drill Team Won 1st place for Dual Exhibition Drill, and 4th place for Male Armed Color Guard at the Florida AJROTC State Drill Competition.

Everglades Legacy Choir 
Established in 2004 and, as of 2015, under the direction of Elvin Negron, the multi-award-winning choir has been recognised as one of the nation's best public/non-magnet school choirs. Also having won multiple out-of-state competitions and being featured in numerous televised events, the choir performed in the singing of the national anthem at the 2014 Miami Heat vs. Cleveland Cavaliers Christmas game.

For many years the choir has been a regular participant of the Merrick Festival Caroling Competition at Coral Cables, in most occasions being placed as a Grand Champion or Runners-up. In a few instances the choir has tied as a Grand Champion with the well renowned Cuda Chorus from Coral Reef Senior High School, a long-time respected and friendly rival of the choir.

Since its inception the choir has consistently achieved in gaining 'Superior' ratings in their Music Performance Assessments both District and State level, exclusively having performed at the FMEA President's Concert in two separate occasions.

In 2015, Everglades Legacy Vocal Ensemble was awarded as a Choir of Distinction at the 2015 MPA State Assessment. Likewise, Everglades Legacy Men's Choir was nominated for the Choir of Distinction award.

Notable alumni 
 Joe Brady, quarterbacks coach for the Buffalo Bills
 SpaceGhostPurrp, rapper
 Sabrina Claudio (Singer) Grammy winner songwriter for Beyoncé
 Tory Lanez, rapper

References 

Broward County Public Schools
High schools in Broward County, Florida
Public high schools in Florida
Miramar, Florida
2003 establishments in Florida
Educational institutions established in 2003